Millman is a surname. Notable people with the surname include:

Dan Millman (born 1946), American author and lecturer
Dick Millman, American chief executive
Michael Millman (1939–2014), American criminal defense lawyer
Jacob Millman (1911–1991), electronics engineer
John Millman (born 1989), Australian tennis player
Peter Millman (1906–1990), Canadian astronomer